Notocetichthys trunovi, Trunov's southern cetomimid, is a species of flabby whalefish only known from the Lazarev Sea near Antarctica where it is found at depths of from .  This species grows to a length of  SL.  This species is the only known member of its genus.

References
 

Cetomimidae
Monotypic fish genera
Fish described in 1989